The 2024 Republican National Convention is an event in which delegates of the United States Republican Party will select the party's nominees for president and vice president in the 2024 United States presidential election. It is planned to be held at the Fiserv Forum in Milwaukee, Wisconsin.

Site selection 

On January 7, 2022, a spokesperson for the Republican National Committee said that four potential host cities have been selected for the 2024 convention: Milwaukee, Nashville, Pittsburgh and Salt Lake City. Milwaukee was the host city for the 2020 Democratic National Convention, whose events had largely been held virtually and outside of Milwaukee due to the COVID-19 pandemic. Milwaukee and Pittsburgh are both located in key swing states (Wisconsin and Pennsylvania, respectively) that have both played a significant role in determining the winner of the Electoral College in recent elections, while Nashville and Salt Lake City are both the respective state capitals of Tennessee and Utah, which have been reliably Republican states throughout most of the previous half-century (even though the capital cities themselves are considered Democratic strongholds within their states). From 2008 through the 2020 election, both the Democratic Party and Republican Party have only held their conventions in swing states. Houston had previously taken steps towards bidding, but decided against it due to conflicts with other scheduled events at venues. Other locations that had, at one point, had an interest in hosting, but which ultimately did not bid, included Columbus, Las Vegas, San Antonio, and the state of Georgia. Kansas City, Missouri had made a formal bid, but withdrew their bid in late December 2021, prior to the finalist cities being named.

On February 4, 2022, Pittsburgh's bid committee announced that their bid had been eliminated from further consideration. In early March 2022, Salt Lake City was eliminated by the Republican National Committee, leaving Milwaukee and Nashville as the two remaining finalist bid cities.

On July 15, 2022, a site selection committee unanimously voted to recommend Milwaukee as the site of the convention over Nashville. The Republican National Committee voted for Milwaukee during its early August 2022 meeting in Chicago.

Milwaukee is the first city to host major party conventions in consecutive elections since New York City hosted both the 1976 and 1980 Democratic National Conventions.

See also 
 2024 United States presidential election
 2024 Republican Party presidential primaries
 2024 Democratic National Convention
 2024 Democratic Party presidential primaries

Notes

References 

Republican National Conventions
Republican National Convention
2024 conferences